Abdulazez Saeed (born 28 January 1990) is a Saudi Arabian handball player for Al-Ahli and the Saudi Arabian national team.

He participated at the 2017 World Men's Handball Championship.

References

1990 births
Living people
Saudi Arabian male handball players
Handball players at the 2018 Asian Games
Asian Games competitors for Saudi Arabia
21st-century Saudi Arabian people
20th-century Saudi Arabian people